Adriaan Jozef  Heymans (or Adrien-Joseph Heymans; 11 June 1839 in Antwerp – December 1921 in Brussels) was a Belgian impressionist landscape painter.

Biography

His father was a trader in window-glass, who died when Heymans was only seven. Afterward, he was partly raised by his uncle, the mayor of Wechelderzande, a small village near Antwerp, where he first learned to appreciate nature.

In 1853, he entered the Royal Academy of Fine Arts (Antwerp), where he studied under Jacob Jacobs, later attending the Académie Royale des Beaux-Arts in Brussels, but he always considered himself to be essentially self-taught. During a stay in Paris from 1855 to 1858, he was strongly influenced by the Barbizon School. By the time of the Brussels Salon in 1860, he was turning toward impressionism.

He soon returned to Wechelderzande and began painting plein air, both there and in the vicinity of Kalmthout. Many other painters came to the Kempen area seeking inspiration; often living in tent camps and waiting for the desired lighting effects. He is also considered to be a member of the "" and the "", because he was active in those areas.

In 1869, he married and settled in Brussels, where he was a c0-founder of the Société Libre des Beaux-Arts and several artists' associations. In 1881, he became an officer in the Order of Leopold and was named a Knight in the French Legion of Honor.

Sometime in the 1890s, he returned to Kalmthout and his style slowly evolved into a form of realism with occasional touches of pointillism to accentuate the colors. By 1913, his health had deteriorated so much that he was forced to give up painting.

References

Further reading
 Henry van de Velde : Adrien-Joseph Heymans: Etude; Revue Générale, September 1889
 Emmanuel Bénézit, Dictionnaire des Peintres, Sculpteurs, Dessinateurs et Graveurs (Benezit Dictionary of Artists), Paris, 1976. 
 P. & V. Berko, Dictionnaire des peintres belges nés entre 1750 et 1875, Brussel-Knokke, 1981.
 Le dictionnaire des peintres belges du XIVième siècle à nos jours, Brussel, 1994.
 Marko vom Felde, Adriaan-Josef Heymans: 1839 - 1921 : Leben und Werk, 1994
 Paul Piron, De Belgische beeldende kunstenaars uit de 19de en 20ste eeuw, 2 vols., Brussels, (1999).
 Gilberte Geysen and Marko vom Felde, A.J. Heymans 1839-1921, Lille 2000
 De Kalmthoutse of 'Grijze' School en haar tijdgenoten; catalogus van de gelijknamige overzichtstentoonstelling in Kalmthout (Exhibition catalog); Lannoo (2007), 
 Wim & Greet Pas: Dictionnaire biographique / Arts Plastiques en Belgique/Peintres, sculpteurs, graveurs 1800-2000, Antwerp 2002,

External links

 Arcadja Auctions: Seven pages of works by Heymans
 A. J. Heymans website. Biographical sketch and other material, archived on the Wayback Machine.

1839 births
1921 deaths
Belgian landscape painters
Impressionism
Artists from Antwerp
Royal Academy of Fine Arts (Antwerp) alumni
19th-century Belgian painters
19th-century Belgian male artists
20th-century Belgian painters
Académie Royale des Beaux-Arts alumni
20th-century Belgian male artists